State Route 286 (SR 286) is a  east–west state highway in the southwestern portion of the U.S. state of Ohio.

History
The SR 286 designation was applied in 1931.  The highway originally ran from its present junction with US 68 (at the time the concurrency of SR 10 and SR 53) to its eastern terminus at SR 134.

In 1938, SR 286 was extended west-northwest along a previously un-numbered roadway to its present western terminus at US 50 southwest of Fayetteville.

Major intersections

See also

References

External links

286
286
286
286